Thale is a former Verwaltungsgemeinschaft ("collective municipality") in the district of Harz, in Saxony-Anhalt, Germany. The seat of the Verwaltungsgemeinschaft was in Thale. It was disbanded in September 2010.

The Verwaltungsgemeinschaft Thale consisted of the following municipalities:

 Thale
 Westerhausen

Former Verwaltungsgemeinschaften in Saxony-Anhalt
Thale